Samantha Louise Hall (born 30 October 1984), better known as Goldierocks, is an English DJ, presenter, journalist and producer.

Biography 
Sam Hall, better known as Goldierocks, was born in Guildford, Surrey, England. She is an only child. Samantha studied at St Nicholas School for girls in Fleet, Hampshire and Farnborough Sixth Form College before moving to London when she was nineteen to study a BA Hons in Drama & Theatre Arts from Goldsmiths College (University of London).

She first went on tour at 16, when she discovered her passion for live music and performance, instigating her career in music journalism.

Samantha now lives in North London.

Radio broadcaster 
Goldierocks was presenter of the weekly global radio show The Selector (July 2009–September 2019) made on behalf of the British Council by Folded Wing .

With an audience estimated to be in excess of four million listeners, The Selector is syndicated to 44 countries around the world including Mexico, China, Colombia, Israel, Poland, Malawi, Hungary, Malaysia, Indonesia, Mauritius, Zambia, South Africa, Kenya, Bulgaria and Turkey.

The Selector has received critical acclaim amongst UK and international press with The Sunday Times citing the show as "more irresistible as the best of John Peel... the country's coolest radio show". The Evening Standard saying "she could be the most influential woman in pop", and The Guardian saying she is responsible for "bringing cutting-edge music from the British underground to the rest of the world."

Sam has presented on UK National radio stations Capital Xtra and Capital FM] presenting evening specialist dance music shows including cover of the Ministry of Sound Clubbers Guide (2014-2015).

In 2014, NME.com broadcast Sam's first radio documentary 'Zaatari: Growing Up In A Refugee Camp' which she presented, produced and funded herself after she travelled with Oxfam to Zaatari in Jordan.

2012, 2013 and 2014 saw Sam host her own shows on pop-up festival radio stations Secret FM (Secret Garden Party) and Bestival Radio.

Summer of 2012 saw Sam anchor a new interactive pop-up radio station 'Reebok Radio' broadcast live from the Manchester Warehouse Project on RWD mag.

Sam hosted a special edition of her own radio show 'The Selector' on the International Radio Festival's 'Official Olympics Pop-Up Radio Bus' in London during the 2012 Olympics.

Sam has presented the Early Breakfast Show on BBC Radio 1, covering for Dev on several occasions through 2011.

'The Selector after Dark' is broadcast on Mexico's Ibero FM, Hoxton Radio, Warsaw's Roxy FM, Shanghai's LOOP FM, Moscow's Megapolis FM and Cape Town's 'Assembly Radio'.

She has made guest appearances on BBC 6 Music's Steve Lamaq's Roundtable, BBC World Service (2013/14), BBC Radio 4 'Today' (2014), Nihal's BBC Radio 1 review show, BBC 5 Live 'Music Review' (2011-2013), Jo Good's Xfm Review Show (2014), Sound Women's podcast (2014), Radio Talk's podcast (2014), Folded Wing 'Tuned Into The Future' podcast (2012-2014), BBC Production podcast (2014), British Airway's 'Highlife' (2012), Kiss FM (2012), Eddy Temple-Morris 'Remix' on Xfm (2012), Diesel U Music Radio (2008) and Brother's Big Ears (2009).

She had done voice over work for LoveFilm, Brit Awards (UK national commercial network), Kiss FM, Malibu, NME, Orange.

In September 2019 Samantha left The Selector Radioshow for "moving forward".

DJ 
Sam first started DJing (2004–present) at Rockfeedback's showcase club nights in London, where she soon gained notoriety for her theatrical and energised DJ appearances with Timeout London saying her live shows had "more personality than a Big Brother house".  She quickly became popular and started performing across the city and abroad and now is one of the most hardworking DJs in UK.

Goldierocks DJ's, in her own words, "eclectic house, world beats, mash up electro and heavy bass remixes". She is well known for her dramatic stage presence and crowd interaction: stage diving, climbing on her decks and crowd surfing.

She has DJ'ed to thousands across five continents. Significant shows to date include Ibiza Rocks, Glastonbury's East Dance Stage, Burning Man in the Nevada Desert, Cannes Lions Festival, the igloo disco of Snowbombing in Austria, the Lake of Stars Festival in Malawi, Cape Town's EMC, Portugal's MeoSudeste Festival, Australia's Gold Coast, SXSW music conference in Texas, Monaco Grand Prix, beaches of Abu Dhabi and the MTV European Music Video Awards in Lisbon and Copenhagen. She has played to rammed stages at endless festivals including Bestival, Latitude, Secret Garden Party, Creamfields, V, Wakestock, Newquay Boardmasters, Boomtown, Isle of Wight, T4 on the Beach, Glass Butter Beach, and Beach Break Live.

2012 saw Sam DJ the opening ceremony of the London Paralympic Games in the Olympic Stadium to 85,000 people in the arena, including the Queen, and over one billion watching on TV across the world.

In addition to this, she has DJ'ed exclusive private parties for Giorgio Armani, Madonna, Jade Jagger & Richard Branson plus warm up slots to Soulwax, The Chemical Brothers & DJ Mehdi.

TV presenter 
2013 saw her become one of the anchor presences of 'Fash Tag', part of the YouTube original content initiative, including their Brit Awards coverage.

2012 saw Goldierocks present her first lifestyle documentary Your Body: Your Image 'Faking It' on BBC2, part of the BBC's body image series. She lifted the lid on exactly what goes into creating a single fashion photo, becoming a model for the day and discovering just how many people and how much patience is needed to transform from girl next door to glamour girl. Produced by Dale Templar (Human Planet), the episode was aimed at young schoolchildren to address body image and was played in classrooms nationwide.

The same year, Sam hosted the official festival coverage for Last FM throughout the Summer, reporting from SW4, Summer Sundae and Bloodstock Open Air. She also featured within 4Music's 'V:Inspired Taking Care of Christmas' seasonal special.

2011 saw Sam be the blue team captain on Channel 4/4Music 'Pop Up Pop Quiz' alongside Ricky and Melvin, and Alice Levine. PUPQ- a travelling pop trivia quiz show complete with inflatable set and guest stars. Hosted by Ricky & Melvin, the red team captain was Alice Levine. Guests included Amy Childs, Lethal Bizzle, various personalities from The Only Way Is Essex, Wretch 32, personalities from Hollyoaks and girl band Belle Amie.

In 2010, Sam became part of the 4Music presenting team on Boom TV (12 week series). She presented alongside Twin B (BBC Radio 1Xtra) and MC Mr Midas. With guests including Professor Green, Roll Deep, N-Dubz and Bashy.

After the success of 2010, Sam was once again the presenter for Brits.co.uk as the official reporter for the Brit Awards 2011. Sam went behind the scenes interviewing the nominees and performing artists and got all the gossip on the red carpet of the UK's biggest music award ceremony. She interviewed huge global stars like Cee Lo Green, Meat Loaf, Lily Allen, Dizzee Rascal, Temper Trap, Duran Duran and infamously persuaded Robbie Williams to pinch Kylie Minogue's bottom.

Sam co-presented the first 3 series of punk-rock show 'Red Bull Bedroom Jam' alongside Richie T (2009–2010). A live online music show searching for the best in unsigned talent, with a band performing a gig live from their bedroom across the country each week.

She hosted the pop editions of HMV's 'Next Big Thing'  (2010) and travelled the UK fronting 'Xbox Reverb' on Xbox Live (2010), an interactive gig experience betweens bands and their fans featuring acts such as Pulled Apart By Horses, Dananananaykroyd, Ellie Goulding and Esser.

Goldierocks has made guest TV appearances on: 4Music 'Adele: Real Stories' (2012), 4Music's 'Lady Gaga: Real Stories' (2010), Transmission Channel 4, Xbox Live, BBC Blast (BBC Three), Jack Wills Varsity Polo Coverage, Jack Wills Varsity Rugby Coverage, SXSW Texas Music Festival Coverage, After Party Warehouse Project, VBS.tv (Vice UK), ASOS.com TV for London Fashion Week.

Production 
Goldierocks most commonly works with Aaron Audio (son of Trevor Horn) on all production and remixes.

Remixes to date include:
The Holloways Two Left Feet (2006)
The Holloways Generator (2006)
Foals Hummer (2007)
Natty Cold Town (2008)
King Charles End of Time (2008)
Lucy & The Caterpillar Kings Cross (2008)
The Kooks Do You Wanna (2008)
Cock & Bull Kid Mother (2009)
Crystal Fighters I Love London (2009)
Zagar Wings of Love (2009)

Goldierocks & Joyride have made a number of free mixtapes for Wakestock Festival, Virgin Maruissa Racing and Syndicate Wake Magazine amongst others.

Journalism & public speaking 
In 2011, Sam flew to Egypt shortly after the Mubarak demonstrations to record 'The Selector' and meet other musicians, DJ's and young people with broadcast media career aspirations. She often visits countries in conflict to work with young people, community projects and refugees, and launch 'The Selector'. In 2013, Sam flew to Libya to work with the Youth Forum in Tripoli, and also travelled to Jordan with the charity Oxfam to visit Zataari, the second largest refugee camp in the world. Experiencing first-hand the lack of amenities and desperate need for aid, Sam created a special radio podcast with interviews and reports from her trip, stirring up public awareness and drumming up extra support for Oxfam's Syria Crisis campaign.

Goldierocks has spoken at a number of specialist music panels at industry conferences such as In The City, London Calling, The Great Escape, The Radio Festival, Sound Women Festival, The Other Club, How Music, Warsaw Music Week and Zurich International Radio Festival.

She has acted as an official Ambassador of British Culture on behalf of The British Council and her work with The Selector sees her hold broadcasting masterclasses and workshops in the likes of in Malawi, China, Zambia, Kenya, Poland, Albania, Bulgaria, Kazakhstan, Ukraine, Bosnia and Mauritius.

Sam currently writes for the Huffington Post and is a contributing music editor for Phoenix Magazine (2015).

Goldierocks started her career as a staff writer for Rockfeedback (2001) interviewing such artists at The Killers, Ash and Melissa Auf Der Maur. Since then she had a monthly Goldierocks column in Spill and UP Magazine throughout 2004 and 2005. She has written guest articles for Music Week, Logo, the beauty pages, NME, The Pix, fashion zine Phamous 69, official Glastonbury blogger for BEAT show on Bebo (2009) and Tamsin Blanchard's "Green Is The New Black" (Hodder, London, 2007).

Modelling 
Sam has modelled in professional campaigns for Nike, Puma, VICE, Nylon, Who's Jack, No 17 and Motorola.

Charity work 
Sam is a spokesperson for 'Lake of Stars' festival in Malawi, Southern Africa and the associated micro-loan projects & AIDS testing pop up centres that the festival charitably funds.

She also supports the Samantha Dickson Brain Tumor Trust, Coppafeel, Oxfam, Macmillan Cancer Support & Amnesty International.

Awards 
Radio Academy's '30 Under 30' Class of 2014
Mixcloud Online Radio Awards 2014 - The Selector 'Best Pop Show' (and Runner Up of Best Online Global Show)
Shortlist 'Brit List' 2013
Sony Golden Headphone Awards (London, UK 2013) - Nomination
Best Regularly Scheduled Music Program- New York Festival 2011 (WON)
Best Radio Show- International Radio Festival, Zurich 2011 (WON)
Best DJ – Urban Music Awards 2011 (NOMINATED)
Best Radio Show- BT Digital Music Awards 2011 (NOMINATED)

References

External links 
Goldierocks website
The Selector
Beaumont Communications

1984 births
Living people
Alumni of Goldsmiths, University of London
English columnists
English DJs
English radio presenters
People from Guildford